Fortunato Calcagno (9 July 1900 - 31 March 1966) was an Italian lawyer, politician and officer.

Biography
He was born in Ramacca in 1900; he graduated in law from the University of Catania. Elected in the first legislature, he represented Christian Democracy party in the Chamber of Deputies; he was mayor of Ramacca, president of the Sicilian Editorial and director of the Sicilian Electricity Authority. In October 1950, a consortium of entrepreneurs headed by The Hon.  Calcagno took over the Corriere di Sicilia, a newspaper founded in 1943 by the anti-fascist journalist Giuseppe Longhitano and the former mayor of Catania Carlo Ardizzoni.

References

1900 births
1966 deaths
People from Ramacca
Christian Democracy (Italy) politicians
Deputies of Legislature I of Italy
Politicians from the Province of Catania
Mayors of places in Sicily